Tonin or Toñín is a masculine given name and a surname.  Toñín is a Spanish masculine given name and nickname that is a diminutive form of Antonio in use in Spain, parts of the United States, Mexico, Cuba, Dominican Republic, Guatemala, Honduras, El Salvador, Nicaragua, Costa Rica, Western Panama, Colombia, Venezuela, Peru, Ecuador, Bolivia, Chile, Paraguay, Argentina, Uruguay, and the Falkland Islands. Notable people with this name include the following:

Given name
 Tonin Harapi (1925–1991), Albanian composer and teacher

Nickname
 Toñín Casillas nickname of José Antonio Casillas Fernández (born 1935), Puerto Rican former basketball player
Toñín Llama, nickname of Jose Antonio Llama (born 1941), Cuban executive board

Surname
 Matej Tonin (born 1983), Slovenian politician

Fictional characters
Theo and Sammy Tonin of Justified
Tonin of Charges.com.br

See also

Tobin (given name)
Tobin (surname)
Tomin (surname)
Tonia (name)
Tonina (name)
Tonio (name)
Tonni (name)
Torin (given name)
Tosin (given name)
Tonic Chabalala

Notes

Spanish masculine given names